King's Highway 34, commonly referred to as Highway 34, is a provincially maintained highway in the Canadian province of Ontario. The route connects Highway 417 south of Vankleek Hill with Hawkesbury. However, this section was decommissioned as a provincial highway and was subsequently redesignated as Stormont, Dundas and Glengarry County Road 34.

Route description 

Highway 34 is short highway which today serves to connect the town of Hawkesbury with Highway 417. The  route ends at Main Street, near the Ottawa River in downtown Hawkesbury. Between these two points, with the exception of the town of Vankleek Hill, the highway traverses the rural Ottawa Valley, remaining straight in a southwest–northeast orientation except through Hawkesbury. The majority of the land use surrounding the highway is composed of commercial shops in urban areas and agricultural in rural areas, though some small woodlots exist alongside the route. Two interchanges exist along the route: at the southern terminus with Highway 417 and with Prescott and Russell County Road 17 (former Highway 17).

Like other provincial routes in Ontario, Highway 17 was maintained by the Ministry of Transportation of Ontario. In 1989, traffic surveys conducted by the ministry showed that on average, 5,050 vehicles used the highway daily along the section between Highway 417 and Vankleek Hill while 16,400 vehicles did so each day along the section between Prescott and Russell County Road 17 and Hawkesbury, the highest and lowest counts along the highway, respectively.

History 
Highway 34 has a very tame history, having been assumed in 1930 and remaining unchanged between then and the highway downloads of the late 1990s, with the exception of an interchange with Highway 417 opened in late 1974.

On November26, 1930, the Department of Highways assumed the road between Lancaster and Hawkesbury as King's Highway 34, providing a connection between Highway 2 and Highway 17 immediately west of the Ontario–Quebec border.
On November 8, 1974, Highway 417 opened between Prescott and Russell County Road 9 (Highland Road) and the existing Highway 17 near from the Quebec border, with an interchange located at Highway 34.
Highway 34 otherwise remained unchanged for over 60 years.

However, budget constraints brought on by a recession in the 1990s resulted in the Mike Harris provincial government forming the Who Does What? committee to determine cost-cutting measures in order to balance the budget after a deficit incurred by former premier Bob Rae.
It was determined that many Ontario highways no longer serve long-distance traffic movement and should, therefore, be maintained by local or regional levels of government. The MTO consequently transferred many highways to lower levels of government in 1997 and 1998, removing a significant percentage of the provincial highway network.
It was determined that the portion of Highway 34 south of Highway 417 had largely been supplanted by the nearby Highway 138, and no longer served long-distance traffic movement. As such, the section of Highway 34 within the United Counties of Stormont, Dundas and Glengarry was decommissioned as a provincial highway and transferred to that jurisdiction on January 1, 1998.
It has since been redesignated as Stormont, Dundas and Glengarry County Road 34.

Major intersections

References

External links 
Highway 34 pictures and information

034